Power Inc. Volume 2 is a compilation album by the American industrial hip-hop group Tackhead. It was released in 1994 on Blanc Records.

Track listing

Personnel 

Tackhead
Keith LeBlanc – drums, percussion
Skip McDonald – guitar
Adrian Sherwood – sampler, programming, remix (1, 6)
Doug Wimbish – bass guitar

Technical personnel
Anna Hurl – design
Tackhead – producer

Release history

References 

1994 compilation albums
Tackhead albums